Harden Thomas Martin House is a historic home located at Greensboro, Guilford County, North Carolina. It was built in 1909, and is a -story, double pile, Colonial Revival style frame dwelling.  It consists of a main block with shallow, gable-roofed projections; two one-story, hip-roofed rear wings; and a porte-cochere. The front facade features a bowed, two-story portico supported by four fluted Ionic order columns with large terra cotta capitals.  Also on the property are two contributing frame outbuildings.

It was listed on the National Register of Historic Places in 1985.

References

External links 

 G. Will Armfield Architectural Blueprints for the Harden Thomas Martin House 1908-1909

Houses on the National Register of Historic Places in North Carolina
Colonial Revival architecture in North Carolina
Houses completed in 1909
Houses in Greensboro, North Carolina
National Register of Historic Places in Guilford County, North Carolina